The Libertine:  Music for the Film by Laurence Dunmore is the album release of Michael Nyman's score for the 2004 film The Libertine directed by Laurence Dunmore. It is the third release on Nyman's own label, MN Records, and the first to receive distribution in the United States, by Inner Knot Records. It is his 50th album release overall. When Naxos Records began distributing MN Records in the United States in 2008, it was included and began appearing in large quantities in stores. This is Nyman's last score for a major motion picture to date, and his last soundtrack release, other than compilation soundtracks.   
   
The score includes the song "If" (as "Rochester's farewell", with partially changed lyrics, removal of the quotes from "Time Lapse" from A Zed & Two Noughts, and the addition of a setting of the Kyrie) performed by Hilary Summers, who originally performed it in the film, The Diary of Anne Frank (1995). It also includes an abridgement by Jeffreys of one of Wilmot's most famous poems, "Signior Dildo", also sung by Ms. Summers. A recurring theme on the album which first appears in "Upon drinking in a bowl" for solo viola, became the basis of the Interlude in C for Accent007 ensemble. "The maimed debauchee" is a fairly brief piece, but resembles the Interlude at its climax. The theme reappears in a longer version as "Against constancy".   
   
The album primarily follows the order of the film, but there are exceptions, including "My Lord all-pride", which immediately follows "Signior Dildo" in the film, as Wilmot steps out from curtains painted to resemble female genitalia.   
   
Portions of the score appear in all-brass arrangements on the album, Nyman Brass.

Track listing
 "History of the insipid"
 "Upon drinking in a bowl"
 "Impromptu on an English court"
 "Upon nothing"
 "The maimed debauchee"
 "The wish"
 "The submission"
 "A ramble in St. James's Park"
 "The mistress"
 "Signior dildo"
 "Against constancy"
 "My Lord all-pride"
 "The imperfect enjoyment"
 "A satire against reason"
 "Rochester's farewell"
 "A satire upon mankind"
 "Upon leaving his mistress"

Personnel
Michael Nyman Orchestra   

Gaby Lester, violin (leader)   
Cathy Thompson, violin (leader)
Thomas Bowes, violin   
Bev Davison, violin   
Manon Derome, violin   
Clive Dobbins, violin   
Jonathan Evans-Jones, violin   
Rebecca Hirsch, violin   
Philippa Ibbotson, violin   
Helen Paterson, violin   
Debbie Widdup, violin   
Kate Musker, viola   
Jonathan Barritt, viola   
James Boyd, viola   
Richard Cookson, viola   
John Metcalfe, viola   

Bruce White, viola   
Tony Hinnigan, cello   
Nick Cooper, cello   
Sophie Harris, cello   
William Scholfield, cello   
Linda Houghton, double bass   
Martin Elliott, bass guitar   
David Roach, soprano, alto sax   
Simon Haram, soprano, alto sax   
Jamie Talbot, soprano, tenor sax   
Andy Findon, baritone sax, flute, piccolo   
Steve Sidwell, trumpet   
David Lee, horn   
Nigel Barr, bass trombone   
Martin Allen, percussion   
Michael Nyman, piano   

Hilary Summers, contralto   
Capital Voices

Music composed, conducted, and produced by Michael Nyman   
Assistant to the composer: Andrew Keenan   
Recorded, mixed, and edited by Austin Ince   
Assistant Engineers: Mat Bartram and Roland Heap   
Orchestra contractor: Isobel Griffiths
Published by Boosey and Hawkes Music Publishers/Michael Nyman Ltd. 2005, except Track 15, music by Michael Nyman, text by Stephen Jeffreys Published by Chester Music Ltd./Michael Nyman Ltd. 2005
Special thanks to Annette Gentz, Elizabeth Lloyd, Rachel Thomas, Polly Hope, Andrew Thompson, James Ware, Declan Colgan and especially Laurnce Dunmore   
Design by Russell Mills (shed)    
Co-design by Michael Webster (storm)    
Photography by Michael Nyman

Michael Nyman soundtracks
Minimalistic compositions
2005 albums